Vishvjit Prithvijit Singh (29 October 1946 - 6 August 2017) was an Indian politician with the Indian National Congress party. He is a great-grandson of Col the Honourable Pratap Singh of Kapurthala.

Biography
Singh was born on 29 October 1946 at Kapurthala House, Jalandhar, to father Kanwar Ranjit Singh and Mother Kanwarani Anjana Singh of Kapurthala, and was later adopted by Kanwarani Surjit Kaur, the widow of Captain Kanwar Prithvijit Singh of Kapurthala. He studied at The Doon School, Dehra Dun (I.S.C.). He was first elected to the Rajya Sabha (the Upper House of the Indian Parliament) in April 1982, representing the State of Maharashtra. He returned for a second term in April 1988.

In 1989, he married Kanwarani Vijay Thakur Singh, who is a diplomat of the Indian Foreign Service and is currently serving at the Ministry of External Affairs, India as Secretary (East).

Singh has been a delegate to several International Conferences as well as to the United Nations General Assembly a number of times. He has been a member of numerous committees of the Indian Parliament and has also done work in the field of perspective planning. He has written extensively in magazines and newspapers on issues mainly related to planning perspectives.

As chairman of his party's computer department, Singh has also driven initiatives to make more use of technology in election efforts, including putting publicity material, speeches and posters online, installing servers, setting up SMS software to facilitate the sending of bulk SMSs, and establishing a support team.

Singh supports dividing the larger Indian states into smaller units.

In 2010, he wrote a book of Hindi poetry entitled Kuch Shabd Kuch Lakeerein, published by Yatra Books, the Hindi imprint of Penguin India. The book was released at the Doon Literary Festival in April 2010.

Controversies
In 1994, Singh was investigated, along with many other members of the Upper House of the Indian Parliament including the current Prime Minister of India, for seeking election from a state of which he was supposedly not a resident by Chief Election Commissioner T. N. Seshan. However, he expressed grudging admiration for the results Seshan achieved in ensuring free and fair elections in which all parties followed the rules. The matter regarding the anomaly in the law was finally settled by an amendment to the law and all these prosecutions have lapsed.

Health issues
Singh has been overweight ever since childhood. Upon his election to Parliament, then-Prime Minister Indira Gandhi ordered Arun Nehru to help him lose weight, as he was nearly 160 kg; his weight dropped to as low as 108 kg once while he was hospitalised for a heart attack, but increased again soon afterward.

Committee memberships
Member of the Special Working Group of the Accommodation Committee for the 9th Asian Games in 1982
Member of The Advisory Council of The Ministry of Textiles, 1984–89
Member of The Working Group for the chapter on Textiles in the 7th Plan Document
Member of the National Productivity Council, 1988
Member, Public Accounts Committee (Fiscal Body of the Indian Parliament), Ninth Lok Sabha, 1990–91
Member, Public Accounts Committee, Tenth Lok Sabha (1999–92), member of the Indian Council for Cultural Relations, 1989–90
Member of the Indian Board of Forestry, 1990–91
Member of the Parliament Standing Committee on Agriculture, Tenth Lok Sabha, 1992–93
Member of the Joint Committee of Parliament for the Copyright Bill, 1992–93
Member of the Parliament Standing Committee on Petroleum and Chemicals, Tenth Lok Sabha, 1993–94
Ex Officio Member of the Publicity and Publication Committee, All India Congress Committee, Indian National Congress, ?-present

Other positions
Special Representative of Congress President and Prime Minister of India to The Working Group Set Up for the Elections to the Namibian Parliament, 1998
Special Representative of Congress President and Prime Minister of India Rajiv Gandhi to Mozambique, 1989
Special Representative of Congress President Rajiv Gandhi to Afghanistan, 1990
Member of Indian parliamentary delegations to New Zealand −1986, Spain −1987, Colombia −1990
Member of Indian parliamentary delegations to the International Parliamentary Union at Punta Del Este, Uruguay in 1990, New Delhi, 1994.
Member of the Indian Delegation to the United Nations General Assembly for the 46th Session in 1991, the 47th Session in 1992, the 50th Session in 1995 and the 63rd Session in 2008
Chairman, Computer Department, All India Congress Committee, Indian National Congress, ?-present

Publications
 Author of Kuchh Shabd Kuchh Lakeerein (Hindi), (Yatra Books, 2010)
 Wrote various articles on politics, economics and perspective planning in: The Telegraph (Calcutta), The Daily (Mumbai), The Free Press Journal (Mumbai), The Hindustan Times (New Delhi), The Pioneer (New Delhi), The Tribune (Chandigarh), The Asian Age (New Delhi). 
Co-author of Congress Approach to Electoral Reforms (Congress Committee on Policy & Programmes (CCPP)), New Delhi, 1988; Power to the People. (CCPP), New Delhi, 1989; Power to the People – The Urban Imperative (CCPP), New Delhi, 1989.

See also
The Kapurthala Royal Collateral Families
Pratap Singh of Kapurthala
Bikrama Singh

References

Further reading
Rajya Sabha Who is who, published by the Rajya Sabha
Website of the Indian National Congress
Chat session with Singh hosted by Rediff

Eradication of Poverty & other Development Issues – Agenda Item 53 – Statement by Mr. Vishvjit P. Singh, Member of The Indian Delegation at The Second Committee of The 63rd Session of The United Nations General Assembly on 22 October 2008
Statement by Mr. Vishvjit P. Singh, Member of the Indian Delegation, at the Thematic Debate on Nuclear Weapons in the First Committee of the 63rd session of the United Nations General Assembly on 16 October 2008
Statement by Mr. Vishvjit P. Singh, Former Member of Parliament and Member of the Indian Delegation, on Agenda Item 27 – Effects of Atomic Radiation at the Fourth Committee of the 63rd Session of the United Nations General Assembly on 16 October 2008
Statement by Mr. Vishvjit P. Singh, Member of the Indian Delegation on the Rule of Law at the National & International Level at the Sixth Committee of the 63rd Session of the United Nations General Assembly on 13 October 2008
UN Press Release regarding the statement made by Mr Vishvjit P.Singh, Former Member of Parliament and Member of the Indian Delegation, in the General Assembly on 20 October 2008 on Adopting a Consensus Resolution for a  Permanent Memorial at UN Headquarters acknowledging Victims of Slavery and the Transatlantic Slave Trade
Statement by H.E. Mr. Vishvjit P. Singh Member of the Indian Delegation at the Thematic Debate on Nuclear Weapons in the First Committee 63rd Session of the UN General Assembly

External links
http://www.uq.net.au/~zzhsoszy/ips/k/kapurthala.html
http://webcast.un.org/ramgen/ondemand/ga/63/2008/ga081020am.rm -Vishvjit P. Singh Speaking in the General Assembly of The United Nations on 20 October 2008

1946 births
2017 deaths
The Doon School alumni
Punjabi people
People from Kapurthala
Rajya Sabha members from Maharashtra
Indian National Congress politicians